This is a list of the busiest airports in New Zealand by passenger numbers and aircraft movements. Passenger numbers are tabulated annually at the end of the financial year (30 June, for the majority of airports). The top 15 airports are shown.

Passenger numbers

2022

2021

2020

2019

2018

2017

2016

2015

2014

2013

2012

2011

Total aircraft movements

This list includes aircraft operating under both instrument flight rules (IFR) and visual flight rules (VFR) and includes international movements. Consequently, the figures do not distinguish between commercial passenger flights and private aircraft movements. It is compiled from Airways New Zealand movement data.

2021-22

2018

2012

2011

References

 

New Zealand
New Zealand
Airports Busiest
Airports, busiest